The voiced bilabial flap is an uncommon non-rhotic flap. It is usually, and perhaps always, an allophone of the labiodental flap, though it is the preferred allophone in a minority of languages such as Banda and some of its neighbors. 

In Mono, the sound has been described as follows:

And, for allophony between the bilabial and dentolabial flap,

In the literature it has often been transcribed by a w modified by the extra-short diacritic, .

In 2005 the International Phonetic Association adopted the right hook v symbol to represent the labiodental flap. Since then, the received transcription of the bilabial flap involves employing the labiodental flap symbol modified by an advanced diacritic: .

Occurrence

Notes

References

Further reading

Olson and Hajek, 2001. 'The Geographic and Genetic Distribution of the Labial Flap'

External links
 

Bilabial consonants
Tap and flap consonants
Pulmonic consonants